The city of Vancouver, Canada, held municipal elections on November 17, 1990. Canadian citizens who were over 18 years of age at the time of the vote, and had been a resident of Vancouver for the previous 30 days and a resident of B.C. for the previous six months, were able to vote for candidates in four races that were presented on one ballot. In addition, Canadian citizen non-resident property owners were eligible to vote.  For the first time, the City used Provincial Voters List as basis for City's List of Electors. 133,107 out of 257,352 voters cast ballots for a turnout of 52%.

Mayor Gordon Campbell, of the Non-Partisan Association (NPA) was elected for a third term. However, NPA's representation on council was reduced, tying with the Coalition of Progressive Electors for five seats each. NPA later regained control of council through a byelection in 1992. This was Campbell's final term as mayor, before entering provincial politics as leader of the British Columbia Liberal Party in 1993.

The following candidates were elected for a three-year term:

 Mayor - Gordon Campbell (NPA) 
 Councillors 
 Don Bellamy (NPA)
 Tung Chan (NPA)
 Libby Davies (COPE)
 Bruce Eriksen (COPE)
 Philip Owen (NPA)
 Gordon Price (NPA)
 George Puil  (NPA)
 Harry Rankin (COPE)
 Patricia Wilson (COPE) 
 Bruce Yorke (COPE) (resigned in 1992, replaced through a byelection by Lynne Kennedy (NPA))
 School Trustees
 Anne Beer (NDP)
 William Brown (NPA)
 Bill Bruneau (NDP)
 John Cheng  (NPA)
 Kenneth Denike  (NPA)
 Craig Hemer  (NPA)
 Ruth Herman (COPE)
 Ian Kelsey (NPA)
 Gary Onstad (COPE)
 Park Commissioners
 Malcolm Ashford (NPA)
 Nancy Chiavario (NPA)
 Dermot Foley (COPE)
 Tim Louis (COPE)
 Jean Porteous (NPA)
 Gerry Thorne (NDP)
 George Wainborn (NPA)

A number of referendum was included on the ballot.  Vancouver voters approved new funds for a new main library, parks and recreation facilities and public works, but rejected an initiative seeking $500,000 to build a new otter habitat at the Stanley Park zoo.

References

1990 elections in Canada
Municipal elections in Vancouver